Tappeh Bur (also Romanized as Tappeh Būr; also known as Tappeh Var and Tepe Būr) is a village in Palanganeh Rural District, in the Central District of Javanrud County, Kermanshah Province, Iran. At the 2006 census, its population was 29, in 5 families.

References 

Populated places in Javanrud County